Honorary citizen of Beijing is an honorary title awarded to foreigners, overseas Chinese and Hong Kong and Macau compatriots who have made outstanding contributions to Beijing's foreign cooperation, economic construction and social development. The honorary citizen's certificate and badge will be issued by the Beijing Municipal Government.

For foreigners, overseas Chinese, Hong Kong and Macau compatriots who have been awarded the honorary citizenship of Beijing, all relevant institutions in Beijing shall provide assistance in their working and living in Beijing. They will be invited to participate in major celebrations organized by Beijing and enjoy VIP privileges.

List of honorary citizens 

As of 30 March 2017.

References 

Honorary citizens of Beijingu
Beijing-related lists
Beijing